This is a list of fictional galactic communities who are space-faring, in contact with one or more space-faring civilizations or are part of a larger government, coalition, republic, organization or alliance of two or more separate space-faring civilizations. They may be large galactic polities, or smaller ones.

Television

Stargate

Alliance of the Four Great Races (SG-1)
Ancient Domain (SG-1)
Ori Domain (SG-1)
United Langara (SG-1)
United Tegalus (SG-1)
Central Authority of the Reetou (SG-1) 
United Nations of Earth (SG-1)
Aschen Confederation (SG-1)
Free Jaffa Nation (SG-1)
Goa'uld Empire (SG-1)
Goa'uld Remnants (SG-1)
Lucian Alliance (SG-1)
United Alliance of System Lords (SG-1)
Eurondan regime (SG-1)
Tok'ra Intellenegce (SG-1)
Quintar Alignment (SG-1)
Tollan Curia (SG-1)
Himmel Reich (SG-1)
Volian Union (SG-1) 
Wraith Domain (Atlantis)
Genii Confederation (Atlantis)
Lantean Domain (Atlantis)
Coalition of Planets (Atlantis)
Novus expedition (Universe)

Star Trek

Borg Collective 
Breen Confederacy 
Cardassian Union 
Dominion
Ferengi Alliance
Gorn Hegemony 
Kelvan Empire
Klingon Empire
Romulan Star Empire
Klingon-Cardassian Alliance 
Terran Empire
United Federation of Planets

Power Rangers

Galactic Space Alliance (Lost Galaxy)
United Alliance of Evil (In Space)
Machine Empire (Zeo)
Evil Space Aliens (Mighty Morphin)

Doctor Who

Dalek Empire
Cybermen Empire
Galactic Empire

Teenage Mutant Ninja Turtles

Pan Galactic Alliance
Federation

Battlestar Galactica

United Colonies of Kobol
Cylon Empire
Eastern Alliance

Babylon 5

League of Non-Allied Worlds
Interstellar Alliance
Galactic Confederation

Andromeda

Systems Commonwealth

The Expanse

United Nations
Martian Congressional Republic
Outer Planets Alliance

Foundation (Asimoverse)

Galactic Empire (Foundation)
Foundation (Foundation)

The Orville

Planetary Union  (The Orville)
Krill Empire  (The Orville)
Moclan Empire  (The Orville)
Moclan-Krill Alliance  (The Orville)
Kaylon Empire  (The Orville)

Star Wars
Fel Empire
Galactic Alliance
Galactic Empire 
Galactic Republic 
Alliance to Restore the Republic
 Resistance
Confederacy of Independent Systems
Infinite Empire
Hutt Empire
New Republic 
Sith Empire 
First Order
Chiss Ascendancy

Films

Marvel

Nova Corps (MCU)
Kree Empire (MCU)

DC

Green Lantern Corps (DCCU)
Kryptonian Empire (DCCU)
Martian Republic (DCCU)

Transformers

Autobot Commonwealth (Transfromers)
Decepticon Empire (Transformers)
Transformers Reaction Force (The Last Knight)
Maximal Commonwealth (Rise of the Beasts)
Predacon Empire (Rise of the Beasts)
Non-biological Extraterrestrial Species Treaty (NEST) (Revenge of the Fallen)

Star Wars

Fel Empire
Galactic Alliance
Galactic Empire 
Galactic Republic 
Alliance to Restore the Republic
 Resistance
Confederacy of Independent Systems
Infinite Empire
Hutt Empire
New Republic 
Sith Empire 
First Order
Chiss Ascendancy

Star Trek

Borg Collective 
Breen Confederacy 
Cardassian Union 
Dominion
Ferengi Alliance
Gorn Hegemony 
Kelvan Empire
Klingon Empire
Romulan Star Empire
Klingon-Cardassian Alliance 
Terran Empire
United Federation of Planets

Video Games

Mass Effect
Asari Republics
Batarian Hegemony
Citadel Council
Illuminated Primacy
Salarian Union 
Systems Alliance
Turian Hierarchy

Halo
The Covenant 
Forerunner Ecumene 
Unified Earth Government

Star Control
Alliance of Free Stars (Star Control)
Hegemonic Crux (Star Control 3)
New Alliance of Free Stars (Star Control 2)
Ur-Quan Hierarchy of Battle Thralls (Star Control)

Warhammer 40,000
Imperium of Man
Tau Empire
Chaos Space Marines
dark Eldar
Tyranids

Sin of a Solar Empire
Solar Empire (Sin of a Solar Empire)

Metroid
Galactic Federation (Metroid)

Star Fox
Cornerian Defense Force (Star Fox)

Wing Commander
Terran Confederation (Wing Commander)

Star Craft
 The Terran Dominion (StarCraft)
 United Earth Directorate (StarCraft)

Stellaris
 The Commonwealth of Man (Stellaris)
 The United Nations of Earth (Stellaris)

ConSentiency
The ConSentiency universe (Frank Herbert's The Dosadi Experiment)

Haruhi Suzumiya
Data Integration Thought Entity (Haruhi Suzumiya)

Marathon
Pfhor  (Marathon)

Adastra
 The Galaxias (Adastra)

Treasure Planet: Battle at Procyon
Terran Empire (Battle at Procyon)

Star Wars
Fel Empire
Galactic Alliance
Galactic Empire 
Galactic Republic 
Alliance to Restore the Republic
 Resistance
Confederacy of Independent Systems
Infinite Empire
Hutt Empire
New Republic 
Sith Empire 
First Order
Chiss Ascendancy

Animated Television

Shingu: Secret of the Stellar Wars
Cosmos Alliance (Shingu: Secret of the Stellar Wars)
Galactic Federation (Shingu: Secret of the Stellar Wars)

Futurama
Democratic Order Of Planets (Futurama)

DC
Green Lantern Corps (DCAU)

Buzz Lightyear of Star Command
Galactic Alliance (Buzz Lightyear of Star Command)

Marvel
Heralds of Galactus (MAU)

Rick and Morty
Galactic Federation (Rick and Morty)

Teenage Mutant Ninja Turtles: Fast Forward
Pan Galactic Alliance (Teenage Mutant Ninja Turtles: Fast Forward)

Sailor Moon
Shadow Galactica (Sailor Moon)

Lio & Stitch
United Galactic Federation (Lilo and Stitch)

Star Wars
Fel Empire
Galactic Alliance
Galactic Empire 
Galactic Republic 
Alliance to Restore the Republic
 Resistance
Confederacy of Independent Systems
Infinite Empire
Hutt Empire
New Republic 
Sith Empire 
First Order
Chiss Ascendancy

Animated films
Green Lantern Corps (DCAMU)
Kree Empire (MAF)
Galactic Alliance (Lightyear)
Terran Empire (Treasure Planet)
United Galactic Federation (Lilo & Stitch)

Star Wars
Fel Empire
Galactic Alliance
Galactic Empire 
Galactic Republic 
Alliance to Restore the Republic
 Resistance
Confederacy of Independent Systems
Infinite Empire
Hutt Empire
New Republic 
Sith Empire 
First Order
Chiss Ascendancy

Literature
Galactic Patrol (Lensman)
Galactic Padishah Empire (Dune)
Galactic Empire (Foundation)
The Galaxy in (Hitchhiker's Guide to the Galaxy)
The Civilization of the Five Galaxies in the (Uplift)
United Nations (The Expanse)
Three Galaxies in 'Have Spacesuit Will Travel' by Robert A. Heinlein
BBS (Democratic Stratocracy of the Milky Way) in ‘Totalitarian’ by Zeke Joy
Sky Canopy Domain (Haruhi Suzumiya)

Star Wars
Fel Empire
Galactic Alliance
Galactic Empire 
Galactic Republic 
Alliance to Restore the Republic
 Resistance
Confederacy of Independent Systems
Infinite Empire
Hutt Empire
New Republic 
Sith Empire 
First Order
Chiss Ascendancy

Comic Books

Hasbro Comic Book Universe (HCBU)
Autobot Commonwealth (HCBU)
Decepticon Empire (HCBU)
Maximal Commonwealth (HCBU)
Predacon Empire (HCBU)
Quintesson Pan Galactic Co-Prosperity Sphere (HCBU)
Prysmosian Commonwealth (HCBU)
Spectral Knights (HCBU)
Darking Lords (HCBU)
Peaceful Nations Alliance (HCBU)
Homeworld Defence Force (HCBU)

DC Comic Book Universe
Green Lantern Corps (DCU)

Marvel Comic Book Universe
Nova Corps (MU)

Boom! Studios' Power Rangers Comic Book Universe
New Power Colliation (Power Rangers Comics)
Galactic Space Alliance
United Alliance of Evil
Machine Empire
Evil Space Aliens

Star Wars
Fel Empire
Galactic Alliance
Galactic Empire 
Galactic Republic 
Alliance to Restore the Republic
 Resistance
Confederacy of Independent Systems
Infinite Empire
Hutt Empire
New Republic 
Sith Empire 
First Order
Chiss Ascendancy

Others

Astropolitics
Galactic Alliances
Galactic Empires
Galactic Fedrations
Galactic Republics
Galactic Unions
Galactic Commonwealths
Galactic Leagues

References

Fiction about galaxies